Mehmet Seyfettin Sedef  (born 5 August 1987 in Kilis) is a Turkish professional footballer who last played as a defender for Çorum FK.

Club career
After passing through their youth ranks, he joined the Beşiktaş senior squad in 2005, making his Süper Lig debut on 28 May 2005 against Akçaabat Sebatspor in the last match of 2004-2005 season. He was loaned to Altay S.K. to the end of 2008-2009 season and Çaykur Rizespor for the 2009–10 season.

Following the away match against Konyaspor played on October 10, 2013, without any prior disturbances or indications, he reported a heart condition as the team was boarding the plane back home. The prompt examinations revealed that he had been suffering a heart attack and was taken into intensive care for the necessary operation and follow-up. He played full 90 minutes in that aforementioned match.

On 31 October 2015, his contract with Gaziantepspor was terminated by mutual agreement.

Honours

Club
Beşiktaş
Turkish Cup: 2005–06, 2006–07
Turkish Super Cup: 2006

References

External links

1987 births
Living people
Sportspeople from Kilis
Turkish footballers
Beşiktaş J.K. footballers
Altay S.K. footballers
Çaykur Rizespor footballers
Konyaspor footballers
Gençlerbirliği S.K. footballers
Antalyaspor footballers
Gaziantepspor footballers
Ümraniyespor footballers
Süper Lig players
Turkey youth international footballers
Association football defenders